The Korea Sogyong Trading Corporation is a North Korean company that exports carpets and manufactures cigarettes.

Origins
Its cigarette manufacturing business began in September 2001 when it formed a 40%-60% joint venture with British American Tobacco called Taesong-BAT. , when the venture became known to the public, Taesong-BAT employed 200 people in Pyongyang and produced 2 billion cigarettes per year.

See also

Smoking in North Korea

References

Tobacco companies of North Korea